Spy vs. Spy is a video game developed by Vicious Cycle Software and published by Global Star Software. The game is based on the MAD magazine's titular comic strip. The game features the two spies ("Black" and "White") in a unique story mode, plus two other game modes ("Modern" and "Classic"), and a multiplayer mode for up to 4 players. A GameCube version was planned, but it was cancelled.

Game modes

Story mode 
In this single-player mode, the player is able to choose between Black Spy or White Spy to complete a variety of missions filled with puzzles and a cast of enemies, including the enemy spy, all of which are AI-controlled. The story has been developed to be like an extended episode of the 1960s cartoon with a modern twist. The choice of spy does not matter –– the player will still receive the same weapons and gadgets on either campaign. Likewise also, there are the same missions each way.  The main story in this mode revolves around the two spies trying to stop the superweapon of an evil general and trying to outsmart each other along the way.

Modern/Classic mode 
These modes can be played in Single player or Multiplayer. The aim of these modes is to collect 4 artifacts, (Key, Disguise, Gadget (Remote), Bucks Bag (Money Bag)) from safes around the map (and a Briefcase in Classic mode to carry all of the items) before the other spy, and then escaping in either the elevator or (in Modern mode) some unusual getaway vehicle. The winner is the player who collects all 4 artifacts from the map and then escapes. This rule applies in both Modern and Classic modes - the only difference is that the 8 Modern maps are all unique and different, but the Classic maps are more like the 1960s cartoon and the original game. The 8 Modern modes are: The Mansion, The Kooky Carnival, The Robot Factory, The Oil Rig, The Haunted House, The Volcano Lair, Area 51 & The Space Station, whereas the Classic mode increases in room size by 1 every level.

Other multiplayer modes 
In this mode, two new coloured spies are introduced, Red and Blue. These spies are AI-controlled with 2 players or can be chosen in 3 or 4-player mode. These are basically Deathmatch/Capture the Flag style games - kill all other spies and capture their flags to win, and can be played in either Modern or Classic modes.

Reception

The Xbox version received "mixed" reviews, while the PlayStation 2 version received "unfavorable" reviews according to video game review aggregator Metacritic.

Sequel and remaster
Around 2018, a sequel and remaster, titled Spy vs. Spy vs. Spy (or Spies) was being developed by ONIGAME team. It was put on hold for a long time until it was eventually cancelled with 
one of the reasons being that ONIGAME asked the rights for the game from Eric Peterson (one of the developers at Vicious Cycle Software which produced the game) but not asking the rights from DC Entertainment which owned the Spy vs. Spy IP.

References

External links

2005 video games
PlayStation 2 games
Video games based on Spy vs. Spy
Video games developed in the United States
Xbox games
Cancelled GameCube games
Global Star Software games
Multiplayer and single-player video games